Teshie-Nungua is a small town and is the capital of Ledzokuku-Krowor Municipal district, a district in the Greater Accra Region of Ghana. Teshie is a town on its own and different from Nungua. The town shares boundaries with Sakumono, Lashibi and Tema.

References

Populated places in the Greater Accra Region